George Washburn may refer to:

 George Washburn (baseball) (1914–1979), American baseball player
 George P. Washburn (1846–1922), American architect
 George Washburn (educator) (1833–1915), American educator
 Washburn Guitars, originally sold under the "George Washburn" trademark

See also
 George Washburn House, Calais, Maine